The Shire of Upper Yarra was a local government area centred on the upper reaches of the Yarra Valley, about  east of Melbourne, the state capital of Victoria, Australia, extending eastwards into Victoria's interior.

History

Upper Yarra was incorporated as a shire on 19 October 1888. On 30 May 1919, it annexed the Lauraville Riding of the defunct Howqua Shire (the Howqua riding itself was annexed by the Shire of Mansfield), and on 4 December 1923 and 15 February 1984, it annexed parts of the Shire of Healesville.

On 15 December 1994, the Shire of Upper Yarra was abolished, and along with the Shires of Lillydale, Healesville and parts of the Shire of Sherbrooke, was merged into the newly created Shire of Yarra Ranges.

Wards

The Shire of Upper Yarra was divided into three ridings on 31 March 1909, each of which elected three councillors:
 Centre Riding
 East Riding
 West Riding

Suburbs and localities

The Shire of Upper Yarra included the Yarra Valley district and towns along the Warburton Highway, extending east through the Yarra Ranges National Park, to a line between the Baw Baw plateau and the town of Matlock,  from Melbourne's central business district.

 Beenak
 Big Pats Creek
 Cambarville
 Don Valley
 Gilderoy
 Gladysdale
 Hoddles Creek
 Launching Place
 McMahons Creek
 Millgrove
 Powelltown
 Reefton
 Upper Yarra Dam
 Warburton
 Warburton East
 Wesburn
 Woori Yallock
 Yarra Junction*
 Yellingbo

* Council seat.

Population

* Estimates in 1958 and 1988 Victorian Year Books.

References

External links
 Victorian Places - Upper Yarra Shire

Upper Yarra
Yarra Valley
Yarra Ranges
1888 establishments in Australia
1994 disestablishments in Australia